Preben Møller Hansen (September 6, 1929 – September 11, 2008) was a Danish politician, trade unionist, writer and cook.

Life and work
Preben Møller Hansen was born in Brønshøj into a religious family. His father was a sexton and his mother wished for Preben to become a priest, but he believed religion to be superstition and became a sailor. He first joined with an EAC ship at the age of 16. During the strikes of 1956, seasoned stewards Jakob Rasmussen and Svend Petersen put him in charge of a sailor's strike. Because of his role in organizing the strike, he was arrested and imprisoned in Vestre Prison, where he was held for ten days before the Seaman's Federation's lawyer got him released.

Møller Hansen was made chairman of the Seaman's Federation in 1968, and was responsible for the union's shift toward communism and a less compromising stance towards employers. In 1976 he was elected to the Copenhagen City Council standing for the Communist Party (DKP).

After a controversy with another union (HK/Denmark, then known as the Commercial and Clerical Employees) involving reimbursement for services rendered to the Seaman's Federation, he was expelled from DKP in 1979. In the national parliamentary election of 1987, Common Course gained 2.2% of the votes and four seats, one of which was held by Hansen. Hansen had a difficult time adjusting to the culture of the Folktinget, and his brief tenure in parliament was marked by icy relations with the leaders of other parties.

In the 1988 election one year later, Common Course fell out of parliament, achieving 1.9% of the vote and thus failing to pass the 2% election threshold. Following this disappointment, Hansen returned to the Copenhagen City Council in 1994, where he was elected standing for Common Course, and would remain elected until the party's dissolution in 2001.

In 1985, Møller Hansen unexpectedly arrived with half a million krone in a cardboard box to give to striking brewery workers. He claimed he received it from a man on the street.

After the party's dissolution he became the manager of a traditional inn in Copenhagen, together with his daughter Janni Pedersen. He was often found cooking in the kitchen, favoring traditional Danish food "as mother used to make it". In 2001, he wrote the cookbook  (The Danish Cookbook) reflecting his lifelong love of cooking.

Bibliography
 Hansen, Preben Møller (1972): ,   About the Seaman's Federation.
 Thomsen, Ulla Nygaard (1987): , Ekstra Bladet  Portrait of Møller Hansen.
 Hansen, Preben Møller (2001): , Askholms Forlag

References

Communism in Denmark
Members of the Folketing
Danish male writers
Danish sailors
Danish trade union leaders
Danish chefs
Politicians from Copenhagen
1929 births
2008 deaths
Communist Party of Denmark politicians
Common Course politicians
Leaders of political parties in Denmark
20th-century Copenhagen City Council members